Alexis Frederick Lange (1862 – August 28, 1924) was the Dean of the School of Education at the University of California, Berkeley and led the effort to found the community college system in the state of California.

References

 Alexis Frederick Lange, Pioneer in California Education, 1890-1924: His Influence and Impact on an Evolving State School System, by Sinon K. O'Halloran, doctoral dissertation, University of California, Berkeley, 1987.

External links
 
 
 Lange bust in Haviland Hall

1862 births
1924 deaths
Educators from California
People from Lafayette County, Missouri
University of California, Berkeley Graduate School of Education faculty